is a passenger railway station located in the city of Tokorozawa, Saitama, Japan, operated by the private railway operator Seibu Railway.

Lines

Station layout
The station has a single side platform.

History
On 13 March 2021, it was renamed to its current name.

Passenger statistics
In fiscal 2019, the station was the 86th busiest on the Seibu network (and the least busiest on the Yamaguchi Line) with an average of 682 passengers daily.  The passenger figures for previous years are as shown below.

Surrounding area
Seibuen Yūenchi amusement park

See also
 List of railway stations in Japan

References

External links

 Yūenchi-Nishi Station information (Seibu Railway) 

Railway stations in Saitama Prefecture
Railway stations in Tokorozawa, Saitama
Railway stations in Japan opened in 1985
Stations of Seibu Railway